The Baylor Bears baseball team represents Baylor University in NCAA Division I college baseball. The team belongs to the Big 12 Conference and plays home games at Baylor Ballpark. The Bears are currently led by head coach Mitch Thompson, who was hired in 2022.

History

The early years (1902–1948)

Baylor first fielded a baseball team in 1902 as Baylor's second varsity sport.  Pitcher Ted Lyons was a player on Baylor's Southwest Conference (SWC) Championship team in 1923.  He would go on to be enshrined in Cooperstown after an outstanding career with the Chicago White Sox.  At this time, Lyons is the only player from a Big 12 or former SWC University to be in the National Baseball Hall of Fame. Baylor did not field a baseball team from 1943 to 1945 during World War II.  However, Baylor appeared in its first NCAA Tournament in 1948 only in its 3rd year of play after the war.

The modern era (1970–2012)

Baylor returned to the NCAA tournament in 1977, led by legendary Baylor head coach Mickey Sullivan, and advanced to the College World Series for Baylor's first appearance in Omaha.  Baylor lost both of its games in the 1977 College World Series, one game each to South Carolina and Minnesota.  Baylor concluded the 1977 season ranked #7 nationally by Collegiate Baseball.  In 1978, the Bears returned to the College World Series but lost its only 2 games again, one game each to Michigan and Miami, Fl.  Baylor finished the 1978 season ranked #8 nationally by Collegiate Baseball.

Baylor has achieved a season 50-win mark in only one season in its history.  This season win total was earned in 1999 under the guidance of former head coach Steve Smith, ending the season with a W-L record of 50–15.  While exiting the national tournament during the Super Regional stage, the Bears ended the season ranked #8 nationally by Baseball America.  It was during this 1999 season that Jason Jennings won National Player of the Year.  As a pitcher and designated hitter for the Bears in 1999, Jason also won the Golden Spikes Award, Dick Howser Award, Rotary Smith Award, consensus Big 12 Player of the Year and was voted a unanimous All-American. Kelly Shoppach would also earn the unanimous All-American honor as a Baylor catcher in 2001 and consensus Big 12 Player of the Year.

Baylor's 2005 squad would become the first to win a game in Omaha.  The Bears went 2–2 including wins over Oregon State and #1 ranked Tulane (a dramatic come from behind win, 7–6), but was eliminated from the tournament after its second loss to the Texas Longhorns, losing 3–4 in Baylor's final game.  Baylor lost 1–5 to the Texas Longhorns in its first CWS game in 2005.  Baylor finished the 2005 season ranked #4 nationally by Baseball America.

In 2012, Baylor went 42–12 and was undefeated at home during conference play in the regular season.  The Bears racked up a mid-season 24-game win streak (including an 18–0 start to conference play) which the players attributed to their adoption of a beaver that appeared along the banks of the Brazos River.  "Feeding the Beaver" – referring to a player hitting a home-run onto the Brazos riverbank – became a year-long team slogan as the Bears earned the #4 national seed and were selected as regional hosts in the 2012 NCAA Baseball Championship tournament.  In the Waco Regional, Baylor lost their first game and then won four straight games to stave off elimination and advance to host the Arkansas Razorbacks in the Super Regional.  Big 12 Conference awards were won by Josh Ludy (Player of the Year) and Nathan Orf (Newcomer of the Year), Steve Smith was named Coach of the Year, and 11 Baylor players were named to All-Big 12 teams.

Baylor has reached NCAA postseason play 18 times, including 13 of the last 15 seasons (1998–2012). The Texas Longhorns are Baylor's most played opponent, including 334 matchups through the 2011 season. Baylor has defeated the TCU Horned Frogs more than any other single opponent with 136 all-time wins.

The Steve Rodriguez era (2015–2022)

In June 2015, the Bears announced the hiring of former Pepperdine head baseball coach Steve Rodriguez. Following a 24-29 record in the 2016 season, Coach Rodriguez and the Baylor baseball team ended the 2017 season with a record of 34-23, good for 4th overall in the Big 12 and an NCAA postseason appearance.

According to the Big 12 website Big12Sports, with 2 picks in the 2017 Major League Baseball (MLB) First-Year Player Draft (pick 719, Montana Parsons and pick 793, Kameron Esthay) "Baylor has had at least one player chosen in 40 of the last 42 drafts, dating back to 1976. The Bears have a total of 138 draft choices in program history and their first multi-player draft since 2014."

Memorable games

Among other games in recent history, Baylor has been involved in 3 particularly memorable games.

"The Comeback" game occurred on May 26, 2001 against the Rice Owls in Houston.  Trailing 9–0 in the top of the 8th inning, Baylor scored 11 runs in the final 2 innings to win the game 11–10. Leading 11–9, Baylor pitching only allowed 1 run on 3 hits in the bottom of the ninth to secure the win. Former Bears and major leaguers David Murphy and Kelly Shoppach both played in this game for Baylor.

"The Marathon" game was played on February 21, 1999 in Houston, TX against the Houston Cougars. This game is notable simply for its duration.  Lasting 6 hours and 43 minutes, Baylor was finally victorious 8–2 after 22 innings of play. The game saw 87 plate appearances by Baylor. The game included a total of 28 different batters collecting 25 total hits, 13 different pitchers and 2 ejected coaches.

The "Miracle on 13th Street" game was played in Omaha, Nebraska at Rosenblatt Stadium on June 21, 2005 against #1 Tulane Green Wave. Trailing Tulane 7–0 in the bottom of the 7th inning, the Bears scored 8 runs in the final 3 innings to beat the Green Wave 8–7 in the nationally televised game on ESPN. The comeback was completed with a ninth-inning game-winning play that occurred with the bases loaded, 1-out, and Baylor down 7-6. The ball was hit up the middle and fielded by the 2nd baseman who fired to first to try to complete the double play. Not only was the throw late, allowing the tying run to score, but it was wild, allowing the winning run to score from 2nd.

Stadium

Baylor Ballpark is the current home of Baylor Baseball.  The park hosted its first game on February 5, 1999, a 3–2 Baylor win over the Long Beach State Dirtbags. A replacement for outdated Ferrell Field (Baylor's on campus home park from 1977 to 1998), Baylor Ballpark was one of the finest collegiate stadiums in the country at the time of its construction during 1998. With a listed capacity of 5,000 people, the retro-styled ballpark was modeled after Plainsman Park, home field of the Auburn Tigers, which had a very similar design, but was smaller.  In 2001 Sports Illustrated on Campus ranked Baylor Ballpark "the best college baseball venue".  And the ballpark was voted as the third best collegiate baseball stadium in a 2003 poll conducted by Baseball America.    Baylor formerly played its home games at stadiums including Carroll Field (on campus), Katy Park (a Waco city field), Dutton Street Park (a Waco city field) and the aforementioned Ferrell Field.  Baylor played its home games exclusively at Dutton Street Park from 1960 to 1976.

The first season for Baylor Ballpark was 1999, although construction continued throughout the season. Despite the construction, Baylor Ballpark hosted its first NCAA Regional that season. It hosted additional NCAA Regionals in 2000 and 2005 along with two NCAA Super Regionals (2000, 2005).  The largest single-game attendance at Baylor Ballpark occurred on April 17, 2004 versus the Texas Longhorns, a recorded attendance of 5,602 crowded the confines to see the Longhorns overcome the Bears 7–6.

Baylor Ballpark has been recognized as a top-tier facility for collegiate baseball. In 2003, Baseball America conducted a survey in which college coaches voted Baylor's facility the third best ballpark in the country.

2005 Baylor Bears
The 2005 Baylor Bears squad was one of the most successful teams in Baylor history. With a strong pitching staff, the squad won the Big 12 Conference and hosted both an NCAA Regional and NCAA Super Regional before advancing to the 2005 College World Series in Omaha, Nebraska.

At the College World Series, the Bears were defeated by the Texas Longhorns in the opening game. However, in back-to-back games, the Bears defeated the Oregon State Beavers and #1 Tulane Green Wave to set a rematch with the Longhorns. Despite leading 3–2 through the 8th inning, the Bears fell 4–3 which ended the season. Despite the loss in Omaha, the Bears were highly rated to end the season. Baseball America, Collegiate Baseball, and USA Today, along with several other publications, ranked the Bears #4 in the country to end the year.

Conference championships

Baylor has won or shared 5 Conference Championships.
1923 (SWC), 1966 (SWC), 2000 (Big 12), 2005 (Big 12), 2012 (Big 12)

Baylor has won 4 Conference Tournament Championships.
1977(SWC),1978(SWC),1993(SWC),2018(Big 12).  
Baylor has appeared in 6 Big 12 Conference Tournament Championship title games.

Head coaches

Season-by-season results

|}

Major League Baseball
Baylor has had 79 Major League Baseball Draft selections since the draft began in 1965.

See also
List of NCAA Division I baseball programs

References

External links